Isostola philomela is a moth of the family Erebidae. It was described by Herbert Druce in 1893. It is found in Colombia.

References

Arctiinae
Moths described in 1893